"Moscow Mule" is a song by Puerto Rican rapper Bad Bunny.  It was released on May 6, 2022 as the second single from his fourth studio album Un Verano Sin Ti (2022) following "Callaíta" (2019). The song's title refers to the cocktail of the same name.

Music video
The song's music video was directed by Stillz and shows Bad Bunny as a merman.

Charts

Weekly charts

Year-end charts

Certifications

See also
List of Billboard Hot Latin Songs and Latin Airplay number ones of 2022
List of number-one singles of 2022 (Spain)

References

2022 songs
2022 singles
Bad Bunny songs
Number-one singles in Spain
Spanish-language songs
Songs written by Bad Bunny